Sri Lanka  participated in the 2nd Asian Beach Games in Muscat, Oman.

Marathon swimming
Sri Lanka sent eight swimmers.
Men
Kanishka Fernando - 10 km
Sahan Rupasinghe - 10 km
Pasindu Porawa Gamage - 5 km
Tharanga Weerakkody - 5 km

Women
Kaveesha Paththini Wasam - 10 km
Methma Wismini -10 km
Sunethra Wijeratna - 5 km
Dilanka Kankani -5 km

Sailing
Sri Lanka will sent two male sailors.
Men
Roshil Weerathunga - Radial Open Laser
Krishan Welangagoda - Radial Open Laser

Beach Kabbadi
Sri Lanka will sent both a men's and women's beach kabbadi team.

Men
Buddhika Charith Abeysinghe
Nuwan Bandara
Poshitha Chanaka
Gayan Don Pasquwelge
Indika Ranasinghage
Harsha Sandaruwan

Women
The women's team withdrew due to a lack of funds.
Shirani Anandage
Nimashi Edirisingha
Premawathi Kawisi Vidanalage
Manoja Maddumage
Malkanthi Sinnasamige
Dileepa Chathurangi Subasinha Arachchige

Beach Volleyball 
Sri Lanka sent two men's and women's beach volleyball pairs.
Men
Mahesh Perera & Wasantha Ratnapala
Asanka Pradeep & Navin Peiris

Women
Both women's pairs withdrew.
Sujeewa Withanange & Nirosha Gunasinghe
Geethika Gunawardana & Leena Pathakada

References

Nations at the 2010 Asian Beach Games
2010
Asian Beach Games